Manomera blatchleyi, the blatchley walkingstick, is a species of walkingstick in the family Diapheromeridae. It is found in North America.

Subspecies
These two subspecies belong to the species Manomera blatchleyi:
 Manomera blatchleyi atlantica Davis, 1923
 Manomera blatchleyi blatchleyi (Caudell, 1905)

References

Phasmatodea
Articles created by Qbugbot
Insects described in 1905